Yesaulovka is a rural locality (a station) in Arkharinsky District, Amur Oblast, Russia. The locality's population is 2 as of 2018.

Geography 
Yesaulovka is located near the right bank of the Khingan River, 85 km southeast of Arkhara (the district's administrative centre) by road. Yadrino and Kazachy are the nearest rural localities.

References

Rural localities in Arkharinsky District